Bror Roy Andersson (born 2 August 1949) is a Swedish former footballer who played as a defender. He won 20 caps for the Sweden national team, and played three matches at the 1978 FIFA World Cup.

He was a strong central defender for Malmö FF and was awarded Guldbollen (the golden ball) in 1977. His two sons, Patrik and Daniel, are both Swedish former international footballers.

References

External links

1949 births
Living people
Swedish footballers
Footballers from Skåne County
Sweden international footballers
Allsvenskan players
Malmö FF players
1978 FIFA World Cup players
Association football defenders